The World Urban Games (WUG) is a multi-sport event featuring both competition and showcase urban sports alongside a cultural festival. The first edition was held in Budapest, Hungary from 13 to 15 September 2019. The event is organised by the Global Association of International Sports Federations (GAISF).

History
The event is the brainchild of the former GAISF President, the late Patick Baumann. Although Baumann's death occurred before the first games, the project was maintained by the new executive of GAISF, and finally announced in 2018, with the first two editions originally awarded to Los Angeles, California. Disagreement over the program led to the venue of the first two editions being changed to Budapest, Hungary. The Games are designed as a showcase for new, urban sports and lifestyle.

List of World Urban Games

Sports

Competitions

 2019 World Urban Games

External links
Official website

References

Multi-sport events
Recurring sporting events established in 2019